The Kastamonitou Monastery, officially called Konstamonitou Monastery (Μονή Κωνσταμονίτου), is an Orthodox Christian monastery in the monastic state of Mount Athos in Greece. It stands on the southeastern side of the Athos peninsula. The monastery ranks twentieth and last in the hierarchy of the Athonite monasteries.

The monastery was founded in the mid-11th century, either by an unknown member of the aristocratic Byzantine Kastamonites family, or by an unrelated person hailing from the area of Kastamon in Paphlagonia. It is dedicated to Saint Stephen. Its history during the Byzantine period is obscure, and until the 14th century it appears to have been a moderate establishment. After it was destroyed in a fire in the 1420s and restored by the Serbian magnate Radič, it attracted many monks from the South Slavic lands, and experienced a century of prosperity.

The monastery's present buildings date to the 18th and 19th centuries. The monastery has about 20 working monks. The monastery library holds 110 manuscripts and approximately 5,000 printed books.

References

Sources

External links

 Konstamonitou monastery at the Mount Athos website 
 Greek Ministry of Culture: Holy Monastery of Castamonitou

 
Christian monasteries established in the 11th century
Monasteries on Mount Athos
Greek Orthodox monasteries
11th-century establishments in the Byzantine Empire
Byzantine monasteries in Greece